Sumners is a surname. Notable people with the name include:

De Witt Sumners, American mathematician
Hatton W. Sumners (1875–1962), American politician
Rosalynn Sumners (born 1964), American figure skater

See also
Sumner (surname)
Summers (surname)